The Carolina Speed were a professional indoor football team that operated from 2007 to 2011 in Concord and Charlotte, North Carolina, at Bojangles' Coliseum in 2009 and 2011. From 2007 to 2009, the Speed were members of the American Indoor Football Association (AIFA). For the 2011 season, the Speed joined the Southern Indoor Football League (SIFL) and the team ceased operations after the season. The owner was Eddie Littlefield.

History
The Speed began in the American Indoor Football Association (AIFA) and first played the 2007 and 2008 seasons in Concord, North Carolina, at Cabarrus Arena. In 2009, they moved home games to Bojangles' Coliseum in Charlotte. The team had decided not to participate in the 2010 AIFA season, but announced its intentions to return to the league in 2011. The team had also announced that it would play its future games at the Cabarrus Arena & Events Center in Concord, North Carolina, marking a return to the facility where the Speed began in 2007.

Due to the merger of the AIFA and Southern Indoor Football League (SIFL), the Speed returned in 2011 play in the SIFL. In addition, the Speed's website stated that they were not returning to Cabarrus and announced their 2011 season would once again have home games at Bojangles' Coliseum.

The franchise was to return in 2013 as the Charlotte Speed and play in the Professional Indoor Football League, after originally deciding to play in the Indoor Football League. However, their charter was revoked prior to the season opener and they have not been heard from since 2012.

Logos
The name "Carolina Speed" comes from the winning name of a contest held at the Cabarrus County fair, as well as paying tribute to North Carolina's NASCAR heritage.

Final roster

Season-by-season

|-
| colspan="6" align="center" |  Carolina Speed (AIFA)
|-
|2007 || 7 || 7 || 0 || 4th Southern || Lost SC Week 1 (Lakeland)
|-
|2008 || 6 || 8 || 0 || 3rd EC Eastern ||  --
|-
|2009 || 7 || 7 || 0 || 4th Southern ||  --
|-
|2010 || rowspan="1" colspan="5" align="center" valign="middle" |Did not play
|-
| colspan="6" align="center" |  Carolina Speed (SIFL)
|-
|2011 || 3 || 9 || 0 || 2nd EC Mid-Atlantic || --
|-
!Totals || 23 || 32 || 0
|colspan="2"| (including playoffs)

2007 season schedule

2008 season schedule

2009 season schedule

2011 season schedule

References

External links
 Official website
 Speed's 2007 stats 
 Speed's 2008 stats 
 Speed's 2009 stats 
 Speed's 2011 stats 

American football teams in North Carolina
Speed
American Indoor Football Association teams
Defunct indoor American football teams
Professional Indoor Football League teams
Southern Indoor Football League teams
Sports teams in Charlotte, North Carolina
American football teams established in 2007
American football teams disestablished in 2011
2007 establishments in North Carolina
2011 disestablishments in North Carolina